Matthew Coleman (born 8 June 1973) is a former Australian racing car driver. He competed in various Australian championships including the Australian Super Touring Championship, the Australian GT Production Car Championship, the Australian Nations Cup Championship, Porsche Cup Australia and the Australian Carrera Cup.

Results

Career results

Complete Bathurst 1000 results

References

External links
Super Touring Register : Matthew Coleman
Driver Database Stats: Matthew Coleman

1973 births
Living people
Supercars Championship drivers
Racing drivers from Victoria (Australia)
Audi Sport drivers
Garry Rogers Motorsport drivers